Quan Trieu station is a railway station in Vietnam. It serves the area northern of Thái Nguyên City, in Thái Nguyên Province.

Buildings and structures in Thái Nguyên province
Railway stations in Vietnam